AmphetaRate is an open source RSS recommendation server. Users sign up and get a URL for a personalized RSS feed. The articles in that feed are aggregated from other feeds. Users can rate these articles so that AmphetaRate learns their taste. It uses Bayesian statistics and a collaborative filtering algorithm called ACF-Nearest-Neighbor to find other articles that they may like. Articles whose ratings have extra impact on the algorithms are marked with "[Training]".

AmphetaRate was originally designed for the web-based RSS reader AmphetaDesk, but now the preferred reader is the Java-based RSSOwl. On June 6, 2004, the developers announced that users could rate articles in the personalized feed from any aggregator. However, rating articles in any feed is limited to RSSOwl. There is a documented API explaining how to add this functionality to other RSS readers.

AmphetaRate will search for articles with keywords determined by the aforementioned Bayesian analysis. Popular BlogDex articles are added to AmphetaRate with corresponding ratings. By entering the URL of a news feed, users and non-users can check statistics about rating in that news feed.

As of August 4, AmphetaRate has 1100 users and usually less than 100 articles are rated each day. AmphetaRate is licensed under the GNU General Public License (GPL).

External links
SourceForge project page
Homepage (unreachable)
AmphetaRate documentation (unreachable)

References 

News aggregators